Quercus buckleyi, commonly known as Texas red oak or Buckley's oak, is a species of flowering plant. It is endemic to the southern Great Plains of the United States (Oklahoma and Texas).

Buckley's oak is smaller and more likely to be multitrunked than its close relative, the Shumard oak (Q. shumardii). The two species are interfertile, and hybrids are common along a line from Dallas to San Antonio, Texas.

Quercus buckleyi was formerly known as Q. texana, but under botanical rules of priority, that name properly refers to Nuttall's oak. This has led to much confusion.

It is a highly regarded ornamental and shade tree. In autumn, the leaves turn vivid red and orange.

References

External links
 Horticulture, Texas A&M University, Texas Red Oak
 Texas Red Oak at the Oklahoma Biological Survey
 Texas Red Oak images at Central Texas Plants (University of Texas)

buckleyi
Endemic flora of the United States
Flora of Oklahoma
Flora of Texas
Flora of the Great Plains (North America)
Trees of the North-Central United States
Trees of the South-Central United States
Plants described in 1873
Taxonomy articles created by Polbot